Disnyssus is a genus of spiders in the family Corinnidae. It was first described in 2015 by Raven.  it contains 2 species, both from Queensland.

References

Corinnidae
Araneomorphae genera
Spiders of Australia